The 9th Emmy Awards, later referred to as the 9th Primetime Emmy Awards, were held on March 16, 1957, to honor the best in television of the year. The ceremony was held at  the NBC Studios in Burbank, California. Desi Arnaz hosted the event. All nominations are listed, with winners in bold and series' networks are in parentheses. Categories were sorted based on running time, instead of by genre.

The top shows of the night were Caesar's Hour and Playhouse 90. Each show won a then-record five major awards, (however, two of Playhouse 90's wins came in now defunct categories).

Caesar's Hour became the first show to be nominated in all four major acting categories. Caesar's Hour also made history when it swept the four acting categories. For over fifty years, it remained the only show to win every major acting award. In 2004, the miniseries Angels in America became the second show, and first miniseries/television film, to sweep the acting field. In 2020, Schitt’s Creek became the first comedy or drama series to win in all four acting categories.

Winners and nominees 
Winners are listed first, highlighted in boldface, and indicated with a double dagger (‡).

Programs

Acting

Lead performances

Supporting performances

Single performances

Directing

Writing

Most major nominations
By network 
 CBS – 59
 NBC – 41
 ABC – 6

 By program
 Playhouse 90 (CBS) – 11
 Caesar's Hour (NBC)  – 6
 The Ernie Kovacs Show (NBC) / Kraft Television Theatre (NBC) / The Phil Silvers Show (CBS) – 4
 Alcoa-Goodyear Playhouse (NBC) / Four Star Playhouse (CBS) / I Love Lucy (CBS) /Producers' Showcase (NBC)  – 3

Most major awards
By network 
 CBS – 11
 NBC – 8
 ABC – 1

 By program
 Caesar's Hour (NBC) / Playhouse 90 (CBS)  – 5
 The Phil Silvers Show (CBS) – 2

Notes

References

External links
 Emmys.com list of 1957 Nominees & Winners
 

009
Emmy Awards
March 1957 events in the United States
1957 in American television
1957 in California
Primetime Emmy Awards